Robert Charvay, (5 March 1858 – 1925) is the pen name of Adrien Lefort, a French dramatist and journalist who
worked for the daily Écho de Paris, where he signed his papers with the nickname "The Yellow Dwarf".

He was the son of Charlotte Jeanne Judlin (1820–1883)  and the French lyrical singer Jules Lefort (1822–1898). His parents divorced in 1872.

His comedy Mademoiselle Josette, My Woman has been adapted four times on the screen:
Mademoiselle Josette, ma femme (1914) by André Liabel
Mademoiselle Josette, ma femme (1926) by Gaston Ravel
Mademoiselle Josette, ma femme (1933) by André Berthomieu
Mademoiselle Josette, ma femme (1951) by André Berthomieu

Dramatist 
 Le Fiancé de Thylda, operetta buffa in 3 acts, written with Victor de Cottens, music by Louis Varney, 1900 ; remade under the title Le Voyage avant la noce
 L'Enfant du miracle, comedy buffa in 3 acts written with Paul Gavault, 1903
 Papa Mulot, three acts dramatic comedy, 1904
 Mademoiselle Josette, My Woman, four acts comedy written with Paul Gavault, 1906
 Monsieur Pickwick, burlesque comedy in five acts, 1911

External links 
Charvay on Worldcat

20th-century French dramatists and playwrights
French journalists
Writers from Paris
1858 births
1925 deaths